Flower stalk and fruit stalk may refer to:
The pedicel of a single flower in an inflorescence
The peduncle of an inflorescence or a solitary flower
Scape, a peduncle rising from the ground level